Noel Diprose (5 March 1922 – 26 February 2006) was an Australian cricketer. He played fifteen first-class matches for Tasmania between 1947 and 1957.

His best bowling figures were 7 for 83 against Victoria in 1950-51.

See also
 List of Tasmanian representative cricketers

References

External links
 

1922 births
2006 deaths
Australian cricketers
Tasmania cricketers
Cricketers from Hobart